Linping Road is a station on Shanghai Metro Line 4. Service began at this station on 31 December 2005.

The station has 3 tracks, one island platform, and one side platform. The inner island platform is not in service. Trains heading clockwise use the outer island platform, whilst trains heading anticlockwise use the side platform. This station is the only station on Line 4 to have 3 platforms.

Station Layout

References

Shanghai Metro stations in Hongkou District
Line 4, Shanghai Metro
Railway stations in China opened in 2005
Railway stations in Shanghai